The Suzuki 2015 ITTF-Asian Table Tennis Championships were held in Pattaya, Thailand, from 26 September to 3 October 2015.

Medal summary

Medal table

Events

See also
2015 Asian Cup Table Tennis Tournament

References

Asian Table Tennis Championships
Asian Table Tennis Championships
Table Tennis Championships
Table tennis competitions in Thailand
Asian Table Tennis Championships